Porpax may refer to:

Porpax (dragonfly) – a genus of dragonflies
Porpax (plant) – a genus of orchids
The central strap of an aspis or porpax shield